Topiwala National Medical College and B.Y.L. Nair Charitable Hospital, Mumbai is a full-fledged tertiary Government medical college in Mumbai, Maharashtra. The college imparts the degree Bachelor of Medicine and Bachelor of Surgery (MBBS). It is recognised by the Medical Council of India. This is one of the oldest medical colleges in Mumbai. It is located near Mumbai Central railway station

Selection to the college is done on the basis of merit through the National Eligibility and Entrance Test. Yearly undergraduate student intake is 150. It was established in 1921.

History
Through donations from the Tilak Swaraj Funds, on the 4th of September 1921, the National Medical College was established. This college started functioning at the Victoria Cross Lane, Byculla. As, in those days, even the Universities were controlled by the British the founders affiliated the institution to the College of Physicians and Surgeons of Bombay and the first batch of students was admitted for its Licentiate Medical Practitioner (LMP) course.

The People's Free Hospital was therefore set up close to the present campus and near where the YMCA stands today.

Dr AL Nair, the person after whom the road, on which hospital is situated today, is also named came into the picture. who was the proprietor of the Powell and Co. dealing in medical supplies and equipments donated two acres of his land for the hospital campus. In 1925, Dr Nair also helped set up a well-equipped hospital which he named after his mother Bai Yamunabai Laxman Nair. He also donated funds to run the hospital. Much later, Mr. MN Desai, popularly known as Topiwala Desai, made a generous contribution of Rs. 5 lacs to the college – which was then named after him as the Topiwala National Medical College.

In 1946, the municipal corporation of the city of Bombay passed a resolution taking over the college and the hospital and acknowledging the strong support from the Municipal Corporation, the Bombay University also affiliated the twin institutions.

The campus has expanded from the two acres donated by Mr. Nair in 1946 to twenty acres in 2006 and the number of buildings in the campus has increased manifold. It provides training courses in more than 25 different medical and allied branches, including 9 superspeciality courses

During the COVID-19 pandemic in 2020, Nair hospital served for 4 months as a dedicated hospital for the treatment of patients with COVID-19. It successfully treated 6000 patients and delivered 500 COVID-19 positive mother's babies, before returning to serve as a tertiary care hospital after the number of COVID-19 cases in the city came under control.

References

External links 
http://www.tnmcnair.com/

Medical colleges in Maharashtra
Universities and colleges in Maharashtra
Educational institutions established in 1921
1921 establishments in India
Affiliates of Maharashtra University of Health Sciences